The Golden Khan of Ethengar is an accessory for the Dungeons & Dragons fantasy role-playing game.

Contents
The Golden Khan of Ethengar is a gazetteer which describes the Ethengar tribes, who are described by Lawrence Schick as resembling "the Mongols at the time of Kublai Khan". The 32-page "Player's Guide" provides an overview of the land, and includes rules for Ethengar player characters and a shaman character class. The 64-page "Dungeon Master's Guide" contains background information on the history, politics, and leaders of the tribes, including the Golden Khan himself and his court. The gazetteer also details the geography of the steppes, the humanoids and other creatures that live there, and adventure scenario suggestions, as well as rules for adapting the material to Advanced Dungeons & Dragons, and a large color map.

Publication history
GAZ12 The Golden Khan of Ethengar was written by Jim Bambra, with a cover by Clyde Caldwell and interior illustrations by Stephen Fabian, and was published by TSR in 1989 as a 64-page booklet and a 32-page booklet, a large color map, and an outer folder.

Reception

Reviews

References

Dungeons & Dragons Gazetteers
Mystara
Role-playing game supplements introduced in 1989